Leonardo Fabiano Silva e Silva, commonly known as Leonardo Silva (born 22 June 1979 in Rio de Janeiro, Rio de Janeiro) is a Brazilian former footballer who played as a central defender.

On November 13, 2012, Silva was called by Mano Menezes to play Superclásico de las Américas for Brazil, against Argentina.

Career statistics

Honours

Club
Brasiliense
 Série C: 2002
 Campeonato Brasiliense: 2002

Vitória
 Campeonato Baiano: 2008

Cruzeiro
 Campeonato Mineiro: 2009

Atlético Mineiro
 Campeonato Mineiro: 2012, 2013, 2015, 2017
 Copa Libertadores: 2013
 Recopa Sudamericana: 2014
 Copa do Brasil: 2014

Individual
 Campeonato Brasileiro Série A Team of the Year: 2012

References

1979 births
Living people
Footballers from Rio de Janeiro (city)
Brazilian footballers
Association football defenders
Campeonato Brasileiro Série A players
Campeonato Brasileiro Série B players
Campeonato Brasileiro Série C players
Sociedade Esportiva Palmeiras players
America Football Club (RJ) players
Brasiliense Futebol Clube players
Associação Portuguesa de Desportos players
Esporte Clube Juventude players
Esporte Clube Vitória players
Cruzeiro Esporte Clube players
Clube Atlético Mineiro players
Copa Libertadores-winning players
Al Wahda FC players
Brazilian expatriate footballers
Brazilian expatriate sportspeople in the United Arab Emirates
Expatriate footballers in the United Arab Emirates
UAE Pro League players